Danil Mamayev (born March 18, 1994) is a Russian professional ice hockey defenceman.

Mamayev played 79 regular season games and eight playoff games for Traktor Chelyabinsk of the Kontinental Hockey League from 2016 to 2018.
He then split the 2018–19 season with three different teams, playing in the Kazakhstan Hockey Championship for Beibarys Atyrau, the Supreme Hockey League for Yermak Angarsk and in the Chance Liga for HC RT Torax Poruba.

References

External links

1994 births
Living people
Beibarys Atyrau players
Belye Medvedi Chelyabinsk players
Chelmet Chelyabinsk players
People from Magnitogorsk
HC RT Torax Poruba players
Russian ice hockey defencemen
Stalnye Lisy players
Traktor Chelyabinsk players
Yermak Angarsk players
Sportspeople from Chelyabinsk Oblast
Russian expatriate sportspeople in Kazakhstan
Russian expatriate sportspeople in the Czech Republic
Russian expatriate sportspeople in Turkey
Expatriate ice hockey players in Turkey
Expatriate ice hockey players in the Czech Republic
Expatriate ice hockey players in Kazakhstan
Russian expatriate ice hockey people